The Pakistani cricket team played a home series against Australia from 28 August to 10 September 2012 in the United Arab Emirates (UAE). The series consisted of three One Day International (ODI) and three Twenty20 International (T20I) matches. The matches began in the late evening to avoid the high temperature of the daytime. The ODI series was reduced due to Australian Cricketers' Association (ACA) and Cricket Australia (CA) concerns about the weather in the UAE during August.

Earlier the International Cricket Council (ICC) approved a six-match T20I series on the request of Pakistan Cricket Board (PCB), but Pakistan still wanted to play an ODI series. The PCB chairman, Zaka Ashraf proposed the matches start in the evening to avoid the worst of the heat. The series was initially scheduled to take place in Sri Lanka but clashed with the dates of the Sri Lanka Premier League (SLPL) and was shifted to the UAE.

Squads

ODI series

1st ODI

2nd ODI

3rd ODI

T20I series

1st T20I

2nd T20I

3rd T20I

Broadcasting Rights

References

External links 
 

2012 in Australian cricket
2012 in Pakistani cricket
2012 in Emirati cricket
2012
Cricket in the United Arab Emirates
International cricket competitions in 2012
Pakistani cricket seasons from 2000–01